The Imam al-Bahir Mosque was a historic mosque located in the city of Mosul, Iraq. The mosque was commissioned by the Zangid ruler Badr al-Din Lu'lu' in 1259 CE. The building has been restored several times, the last reconstruction in 2022.

Construction 
The mosque contained the tomb of Imam al-Baher, a descendant of Imam Husayn, which was situated next to the prayer hall. The door to the shrine was made with blue marbles, and the ledges made of marble had the Throne Verse of the Qur'an inscribed on it. The tomb itself contained a wooden sarcophagus draped in cloth, believed to be the grave of the Sayyid himself.

The structure was rebuilt in 1940. The mihrab of the original building was removed to the National Museum of Iraq during the 1940s reconstruction. The mihrab takes the form of a pointed niche which the semidome is articulated with muqarnas. Framing the niche is an Arabic inscription band containing Qur'anic verses.

The prayer hall was topped by the  dome. The mosque had a steel minaret as well.

Demolition 
In 2014, the mosque was destroyed by the Islamic State of Iraq and Levant by explosives.

Reconstruction

See also

 Islam in Iraq
 List of mosques in Iraq

References

12th-century mosques
Seljuk architecture
Mosques in Mosul
Buildings and structures destroyed by ISIL
Destroyed mosques